Harry Herbert (2 August 1934 – 19 January 2011) was an Australian rules footballer for the Geelong Football Club and a Victorian policeman. 

Born in Warrnambool, he played in the Geelong team that holds the VFL/AFL record for the longest run of winning games in succession (26 matches). He also played cricket and was once rated by the famous English cricketer, Sir Leonard Hutton, who was on tour in Australia, as Australia's fastest bowler.

References 
 

1934 births
Geelong Football Club players
Warrnambool Football Club players
Australian rules footballers from Victoria (Australia)
2011 deaths
Australian police officers
People from Warrnambool